Aman ul-Mulk (1 January 1821 – 30 August 1892) was the Mehtar of Chitral, Ghizer, Yasen and Ishkoman and Suzerain of Kafiristan. He ruled the State of Chitral from 1857 to 1892. His rule saw Chitral reach its territorial peak, extending from Ishkamun in Gilgit Agency to Asmar in Afghanistan. His death lead to the Siege of Chitral, an instance of high drama which goes down in the annals of British India as an epic of enormous courage and determination.

Early years

Accession and attributes 
Muhtarram Shah Kator the III was succeeded by Aman ul-Mulk. In order to succeed Aman ul-Mulk had killed his elder brother in 1856. Thus in 1857, Aman climbed to the throne of Chitral, by steps slippery with the blood he had shed. He is referred to in local chronicles as the Great Mehtar, who ruled over the valleys with true oriental despotism between 1857 and 1892. Sir George John Younghusband denoted him as a “strong and astitute” ruler. Lord Curzon acclaimed him as "The very man for such a state and such times”.

Territorial expansion 
Aman ul-Mulk ruled over Upper and Lower Chitral extending from the borders of Punjab on one side to the borders of Kafiristan and Dir on the other. The northern boundary of his dominion was the watershed of the Hindu Kush. In those early years, up to 1871, Chitral still paid tribute to Badakhshan in slaves, but it would be absurd to infer from this fact that Chitral ever acknowledged the suzerainty of Jehandar Shah or of the Afghan faction that dispossessed him.

1878 agreement and effects 
In 1878 Aman ul-Mulk being anxious of aggression by the Amir of Afghanistan placed Chitral under the nominal suzerainty of the Maharaja of Kashmir. This brought him into direct touch with the Government of India, with whom from that time until his death he did all he could to maintain friendly relations. In 1885 a mission under Sir William Lockhart visited Chitral and was very cordially received, and so too was Colonel Durand, who went there in 1888.

By the agreement of 1878 Aman ul-Mulk the Mehtar or King of Chitral got an annual subsidy of Rs 12,000 from the ruler of Kashmir. The Mehtar was to present the latter annually three horses, five hawks and five Tezi dogs. Further a treaty was signed between the Amir of Afghanistan and Mortimer Durand that the former would not interfere in Bajaur, Dir, Swat and Chitral. But the disagreements increased after settlement. More than anything else, it was Aman ul-Mulk, sense of his own interests which led him to rely upon Kashmir and the British.

Aman ul-Mulk, now secure and strengthened, swiftly eliminated his old rivals south of the Hindu Kush and was able as a result to expand his dominion from Ishkamun in the Gilgit Agency to Asmar in Afghanistan. The two valleys of Chitral, along the perceived border with Afghanistan were unified under Aman ul-Mulk in 1880, with encouragement from Colonel Biddulph.

External pressures 

For the first time after the withdrawal of the Gilgit Agency in 1881 the Amir of Afghanistan Abd-ar-Rahman, in a letter, claimed suzerainty over Chitral in 1882, he claimed Chitral in unqualified terms and asked its rule Aman ul-Mulk to acknowledge his suzerainty and declared that the British had no right of interference with the affairs of his Chiefship. The Governor General of India, Lord Ripon could not leave the letter unchallenged. After telegraphic references to London for permission to threaten Abd-ar-Rahman with ‘force of arms if needful’. Ripon warned him, tactfully, whereupon Abd-ar-Rahman promised to desist from interfering in the affairs of Chitral in the future.

However, on 14 June 1877, officials of the Amir came to Chitral to arrange for the betrothal of one of the Mehtars daughters to the Amirs eldest son, Sardar Habibullah Khan. And to hussel the Mehtar into concluding the matrimonial alliance. The Amir imposed political and economic pressures. Aman however did not crumble to this pressure and continued to be reluctant to enter into the said marriage alliance without the sanction of the British Government. With the few incidence of turbulence apart Chitral remained relatively undisturbed during this period noting which Churchill wrote, "Meanwhile Aman ul-Mulk ruled in Chitral showing great respect for the wishes of the British Government and in the enjoyment of his subsidy and comparative peace".

Further events 
In October 1889, Colonel Durand arrived in Chitral, the Mehtars reception of his guest was most cordial. During the course of the visit Aman readily agreed to the following depending on receipt of increased subsidy:
 His assistance in opening up the Peshawar-Chitral road.
 Improving the main path in his country to tracks passable by laden muels.
 Fortification of certain selected positions to be afterword's pointed out to him.

In 1886, and again in 1888, he sent two of his sons, Afzal ul-Mulk and Nizam ul-Mulk, down to India. They came back much impressed with what they had seen and did all they could to strengthen the alliance of their father with the Great Sircar.

Death

Expiry 
Aman ul-Mulk died very suddenly and all the circumstances of his death indicate that he succumbed in the ordinary course of nature to a sudden attack of illness but it is so unusual in Chitral for a Mehtar to come to a peaceful end, that most of the Chitralies believe that he was poisoned.

Gravity 
By the time of Aman ul-Mulk's death in 1892, Chitrals primary importance was that it contained the series of valleys stretching from Wakhan to British held India. Fear of this area as an invasion route went back to 1874, amid the claim that Russia could be in British territory within thirteen days with an army if held Chitral. During the Viceroyalty of Lord Lytton, it was deemed expedient, in view of Russian military activity in Central Asia, to obtain more effective control over the passes of the Hindu Kush. And it was the same menace, real or fanciful, which prompted the Marquess of Lansdowne to re-establish the Gilgit Agency in 1889.

Until 1892 Mehtar Aman ul-Mulk had provided a sturdy bulwark to British interests, his death had jeopardised that security. The British preferred to conciliate Nizam ul-Mulk, as he was connected with Umra Khan of Jandul and with the influential Mullah Shahu Baba of Bajaur through his maternal uncle Kokhan Beg. He also had connections in Badakshan, Hunza and Dir.

Build-up to the siege of Chitral 
However, with Aman ul-Mulks death, all hell broke loose in Chitral, a three way struggle for succession broke out between two of his sons, Nizam ul-Mulk and Afzal ul-Mulk and their uncle Sher Afzal. Having the fortune of being on the spot Afzal took control and proclaimed himself Mehtar. The first thing that Afzal did was to invite as many brothers as were within reach to a banquet where he murdered them.

Nizam ul-Mulk was away in Yasin, of which he was the governor, when the Mehtarship was seized by his brother Afzal ul-Mulk. Anxious to consolidate his power Afzal asked the British that an officer might be sent to reside permanently in Chitral. Before, however, any arrangements could be made he was killed, after a short reign of a few months, by his uncle Sher Afzal. Nizam ul-Mulk at once hurried to Chitral and succeeded in ousting Sher Afzal.

Nizam, like his brother, asked that a political officer might reside in Chitral territory, and Captain Youngshusband was accordingly sent to Mastuj. Later probably not feeling himself very secure Nizam urged for the headquarters of the residence political officer who happened at that time to be Lieutenant Gurdon, to be shifted from Mastuj to Chitral but while the question was still under determination the Mehtar was murdered by his brother Amir ul-Mulk. Amir demanded recondition from Lieutenant Gurdon who was acting as assistant political agent in Chitral. When Amir ul-Mulk came to him he very properly said that he had no power to grant recognition until instructed to do so by the Government of India but that in all probability he would be recognised.

Aftermath 
Amir ul-Mulk had shown himself quite unfit to rule. He had made himself hateful to the Chitralies and had been guilty of treachery to the English. Sir George Robertson therefore declared that subject to the approval of the Government of India, Shuja ul-Mulk his younger brother was recognised as Mehtar. The critical nature of the situation leading up to the siege of Chitral is brought out very clearly in the speech made by Lord Elgin, the Viceroy of India, on 29 March 1895, to the Supreme Legislative Council.

Description 
Though admirably suited to govern a savage people, he was exceedingly cruel, treacherous and vindictive. Sir Lepel Griffin has called him – ''a translucent old savage''. At his accession he killed all his near relations except his brother Sher Afzul, who fled. Historian John Keay has put him down as  "the cunning genius". whereas orientalist, Gottlieb Wilhelm Leitner has referred to him as, "A terrible man, who to extraordinary courage joined the arts of the diplomatist".

Murder of Hayward 
Aman ul-Mulk is believed to be the instigator of the murder of  British explorer George W. Hayward through the agency of Mir Wali of Yasin.

References

Military history of British India
North-West Frontier Province
Mehtars of Chitral
Princely rulers of Pakistan
Nawabs of Pakistan